Erica Barbieri (born 2 March 1981 in La Spezia, Italy) is an Italian judoka. She competed in the 70 kg event at the 2012 Summer Olympics and lost in the first round to Hwang Ye-Sul.

References

External links
 
 
 

1981 births
Living people
Italian female judoka
Judoka at the 2012 Summer Olympics
Olympic judoka of Italy
Mediterranean Games bronze medalists for Italy
Competitors at the 2009 Mediterranean Games
Universiade medalists in judo
Mediterranean Games medalists in judo
Universiade bronze medalists for Italy
Judoka of Centro Sportivo Carabinieri
Medalists at the 2007 Summer Universiade
20th-century Italian women
21st-century Italian women